This is a list of electoral results for the electoral district of Yeerongpilly in Queensland state elections.

Members for Yeerongpilly

Election results

Elections in the 2010s

Elections in the 2000s

References

Queensland state electoral results by district